Hotel Moskva or Hotel Moscow may refer to:

Hotel Moskva, Belgrade, hotel in Belgrade, Serbia
Four Seasons Hotel Moscow, hotel in Moscow, Russia
Hotel Moscow, characters in the manga and anime Black Lagoon

See also
Moskva (disambiguation)

ru:Москва (значения)#Гостиницы